Just compensation is a right enshrined in the Fifth Amendment to the U.S. Constitution (and counterpart state constitutions), which is invoked whenever private property is taken (also in some states damaged) by the government. Usually, the government (condemnor) files an eminent domain action to take private property for "public use.", but when it fails to do so and pay for the  taking, the owner may seek compensation in an action called "inverse condemnation." For reasons of expedience, courts have been generally using fair market value as the measure of just compensation, reasoning that this is the amount that a willing seller would accept in a voluntary sales transaction, and therefore it should also be payable in an involuntary one. However, the U.S. Supreme Court has repeatedly acknowledged that "fair market value" as defined by it falls short of what sellers would demand and receive in voluntary transactions.

Market value
Market value is the prevailing, but not exclusive measure of Just Compensation. Fair Market Value is defined by appraisers as the most probable price, in terms of cash that would be paid by a willing buyer to a willing seller, each being fully informed of the property's good and bad features, with the property being exposed on the market for an adequate time to attract offers. But in eminent domain cases value is defined as the highest price obtainable in the open market. That value may not be influenced by factors that affect the market because of the imminence of the eminent domain taking. In other words, the property must be valued as if the project for which it is being taken did not exist — this is known as the "project influence" doctrine.

Since fair market value involves a future, hypothetical transaction (the property's sale has not yet taken place at the time of valuation) fair market value is shown by the opinion of expert appraisers, or the property's owner(s).

A fundamental attribute of property that determines its Market Value is its highest and best use, which is its most profitable legal use. This need not be the property's current use, nor the use(s) for which the property is currently zoned, if it is established that there is a probability of zone change. Highest and best use is often the subject of contentious litigation. Condemning Authorities commonly argue for Highest and Best Uses that are far less intensive than what a private property owner's appraiser has in mind. This is often the real battleground in eminent domain valuation cases.

In unusual cases measures of compensation other than fair market value can be employed;  United States v. Pewee Coal Co., 341 U.S. 114 (1951) (increased operational loss of a coal company during its temporary seizure by the government deemed to be the measure of compensation).

In eminent domain cases, the standard is often not the most probable price, but the highest price obtainable in a voluntary sale transaction involving the subject property. Since the condemnation deprives the owner of the opportunity to take his or her time to obtain top dollar in the market, the law provides it by defining fair market value as the highest price the property would bring in the open market.

Market value does not include incidental losses (e.g., cost of moving, loss of business goodwill, etc.), but some of these losses are made compensable in part by statutes, such as the federal Uniform Relocation Assistance Act (Code of Federal Regulations 49) and its state counterparts. The judicial denial of compensation for business losses inflicted when a business conducted on the taken land is destroyed by the taking, has been the subject of much controversy and severe criticism by legal commentators. Nonetheless, only one state (Alaska) allows their recovery in all cases and so do a few others upon a showing that it is impossible for the affected business to relocate. Some states allow recovery of business losses by statute.

Likewise, the property owner's attorneys' and appraisers' fees are not included in just compensation. In some states they are recoverable by statute when the owner recovers compensation that exceeds the Condemning Authority's offer or evidence by a specific amount. In California and New York an award of such fees is discretionary with the court when this occurs.

When payment of just compensation is delayed, the owner is also entitled to receive interest on the amount of the late payment.

An important but largely ignored aspect of just compensation in eminent domain is that where the condemnor takes the owner's entire parcel of land, it does not actually pay anything (except for transactional costs) because it only exchanges one asset (money) for another asset of equal value (land at its fair market value). So at the end of the transaction—assuming a fair valuation process—both sides are theoretically as well off as they were before. Their balance sheets are unchanged. The British use more accurate terminology and call eminent domain "Compulsory Purchase" which is economically accurate, if not entirely grammatical (it is the sale not the purchase that is compulsory).

See also
Lindsay v. Commissioners

References

American legal terminology